The first USS Avalon was a United States Navy patrol vessel acquired in 1917 but possibly never commissioned.

Avalon was built in 1908 as the private motorboat Usona by the Greenport Basin & Construction Company at Greenport, New York. She later was renamed Avalon.

In 1917, the U.S. Navy inspected Avalon for possible naval service during World War I. On 19 May 1917 officials of the 3rd Naval District took control of her for use as a section patrol boat.

Avalons name was placed on the Navy List, but she never received a section patrol (SP) number and no records have been found showing her to have been commissioned or describing any naval service by Avalon. However, she appears to have remained in Navy custody until 22 December 1918, when she was stricken from the Navy List. The Navy returned her to her owner the same day.

Notes

References

Avalon at Department of the Navy Naval History and Heritage Command Online Library of Selected Images: U.S. Navy Ships -- Listed by Hull Number "SP" #s and "ID" #s -- World War I Era Vessels without Numbers (listed alphabetically by name)
NavSource Online: Section Patrol Craft Photo Archive Avalon

Patrol vessels of the United States Navy
World War I patrol vessels of the United States
Ships built in Greenport, New York
1908 ships